The Battle of Ar-Rutbah was a military offensive in Iraq launched by the Iraqi Army to recapture the strategic town of Ar-Rutbah from ISIL, along with the rest of the Ar-Rutba District.

Background

On March 13, a senior Iraqi general reported that ISIL has fully withdrawn from the city of Ar-Rutbah to Al-Qa'im, after they began leaving the night before. The withdrawal was confirmed by a member of Anbar's security council. It was also reported that ISIL had abandoned the town of Kabisa as well, and they had also withdrawn from Hīt to some degree, with Iraqi warplanes bombing the retreating militants. This was the first time that ISIL has withdrawn from a major urban area without an actual fight, and the retreat came after recent losses on the battlefield for ISIL in Syria and in the Anbar Province, including a recent offensive on Hīt. However, ISIL returned to the town on the following day.

The offensive
On May 16, the Iraqi Army launched an offensive to recapture the town of Ar-Rutbah, and the rest of the Ar-Rutba District. The Iraqi Army attacked the town from three directions. A US official stated that Ar-Rutbah wasn't as well defended by ISIL as Ramadi or Fallujah, and that there were 100 to several hundred ISIL militants based in the town. On May 17, the commander of Anbar Operations, Major General Hadi Rseg announced that Iraqi Army fully recaptured Ar-Rutbah, and the surrounding areas in the Ar-Rutbah District. During the clashes, at least 4 Iraqi soldiers were killed and 5 more were wounded, and around 100 ISIL fighters were killed. The town is of strategic value as it sits on key transit routes between Iraq and Jordan. Its recapture has denied the ISIL of a "critical support zone".

See also
 Battle of Ramadi (2014–15)
 Siege of Fallujah (2016)
 Mosul offensive (2016)
 List of wars and battles involving ISIL

References

Conflicts in 2016
Military operations of the Iraqi Civil War in 2016
Military operations of the War in Iraq (2013–2017) involving the Iraqi government
Military operations of the War in Iraq (2013–2017) involving the Islamic State of Iraq and the Levant
May 2016 events in Iraq